Adrian Coote (born 30 September 1978) is a former professional footballer who played as a striker. Born in England, he made six appearances for the Northern Ireland national team.

Career
Born in Belton, near Great Yarmouth, Coote came through the youth system at Norwich City, for whom he scored 3 goals in 61 appearances. While at Carrow Road, he won six full international caps with Northern Ireland.

Norwich sold Coote to Colchester United for £50,000, but was unable to establish himself in the side, and, after a loan spell at Bristol Rovers where he scored once against Leyton Orient, he was released by Colchester shortly after the start of the 2003–04 season.

After leaving Layer Road, Coote played for a series of non-league clubs in Norfolk including Wroxham.

Coote, who is now a sales manager for Brighthouse, said: "I did have some injury problems. I just fell out of love with football and am now moving on with my life - which is a good life."

References

External links

Career information at ex-canaries.co.uk
Information re Coote's international career
Carpathians FC

Sources
Canary Citizens by Mark Davage, John Eastwood, Kevin Platt, published by Jarrold Publishing, (2001), 

1978 births
Living people
Association footballers from Northern Ireland
Norwich City F.C. players
Roda JC Kerkrade players
Colchester United F.C. players
Bristol Rovers F.C. players
Wivenhoe Town F.C. players
Dereham Town F.C. players
Wroxham F.C. players
Gorleston F.C. players
Northern Ireland international footballers
Sportspeople from Great Yarmouth
Association football forwards
Northern Ireland under-21 international footballers
English Football League players
People from the Borough of Great Yarmouth